"Dr. No" is a song released by German music group Systems in Blue. The song was released as a single on February 19, 2008, and was produced by Michael Scholz, Detlef Wiedeke and Thomas Widrat. It was the first single released by the group since Rolf Köhler's (lead singer) death.

Background 
The song was produced by Systems in Blue and Thomas Widrat. The song was recorded in 2007, and it was going to be released the same year. However, the lead singer of the group Rolf Köhler died suddenly on September 16, postponing the single's and "Out of the Blue"'s release.

The song was released on February 19, 2008.

Track listing 
 CD single
 "Dr. No" (Radio Edit) - 3:30
 "Dr. No" (Maxi Version) - 6:03
 "Dr. No" (Instrumental Version) - 3:30

Charts

Personnel 
 Music and lyrics by Rolf Köhler, Michael Scholz, Detlef Wiedeke and Thomas Widrat.
 Mastered by Detlef Wiedeke
 Published by Spectre Media, Germany

References 

2008 singles
Systems in Blue songs
Songs written by Rolf Köhler
Songs written by Michael Scholz
Songs written by Detlef Wiedeke
2008 songs
Universal Records singles